George Tweedy Stallings (November 17, 1867 – May 13, 1929) was an American professional baseball catcher and manager. He played in Major League Baseball for the Brooklyn Bridegrooms and Philadelphia Phillies in 1890 and 1897 to 1898 and managed the Phillies, Detroit Tigers, New York Highlanders, and Boston Braves between 1897 and 1920.

Stallings led the 1914 Boston Braves from last place in mid-July to the National League championship and a World Series sweep of the powerful Philadelphia Athletics – resulted in a nickname he would bear for the rest of his life: "The Miracle Man."

Playing career
Stallings was born on November 17, 1867, in Augusta, Georgia. Stallings graduated from the Virginia Military Institute in 1886.  He entered medical school, but was instead offered a contract by Harry Wright, manager of the Philadelphia Phillies.  He was cut in spring training.  Stallings was a mediocre player: he appeared in only seven major league games as a catcher, first baseman and outfielder with Brooklyn (1890) and the Phillies (1897–98) and had only two hits in 20 at-bats, hitting a weak .100.

Managerial career
As a manager, he had a mixed major league resume prior to 1914: a poor record with the Phillies (1897–98), then mild successes in the American League with the Detroit Tigers (1901) and New York Highlanders (1909–10). In the minor leagues, he managed the  Nashville Seraphs to win the Southern League pennant; he also played an infield position on the team. He also managed Detroit before it became a major league team in part of 1896 and from the end of 1898 through its becoming a charter member of the American League. He was also part-owner of the Tigers during their first season as a major league team.

Named manager of the last-place Braves after the 1912 season, Stallings raised Boston to fifth place in the NL in his first season, 1913, but the Braves were sunk at the bottom of the eight-team league and  games from the frontrunning New York Giants on July 15, 1914, when they began their meteoric rise. With Stallings expertly handling a roster of light hitters (Boston hit only .251 as a team) and relying on pitchers Dick Rudolph and Bill James (who each won 26 games), the Braves won 52 of their final 66 contests to overtake the other seven National League teams and finish  games in front of the second-place Giants. They then defeated the heavily favored Philadelphia Athletics in four straight games to earn the nickname "Miracle Braves."

Stallings is credited with being the first manager to use platooning to good effect. It was not strictly left/right hand platooning (there were then relatively few southpaw pitchers), but he did change his lineup significantly when the Braves played a team starting a left-handed pitcher.  Bill James credits him with being the first major league manager to use platooning as a weapon, rather than to cover a hitter's weaknesses.

The 1914 championship was the only World Series title earned by the Braves during their tenure in Boston, which lasted through March 1953.  It also was Stallings’ first and only big league championship. He managed the Braves through 1920, but posted no winning season after 1916.  His career major league managing record was 879 wins, 898 losses (.495) over 13 years.

Stallings was responsible for bringing professional baseball back to the city of Montreal, Quebec. In 1928, his partnership with Montreal lawyer and politician Athanase David and businessman Ernest Savard resurrected the Montreal Royals as part of the International League.  They built the modern new Delorimier Stadium in downtown Montreal.

Stallings was famous for his superstitions, and for his nervousness on the bench.  He has been described as both "distinguished" and salty-tongued.  He died in Haddock, Georgia at age 61 of heart disease.  According to legend, when asked by his physician why he had a bad heart, Stallings replied, "Bases on balls, doc ... those damned bases on balls." He was buried in Riverside Cemetery in Macon, Georgia.

Managerial record

See also

List of Major League Baseball player–managers

References

External links

 

1867 births
1929 deaths
Brooklyn Bridegrooms players
Philadelphia Phillies players
Baseball managers
Major League Baseball player-managers
19th-century baseball players
Philadelphia Phillies managers
Detroit Tigers managers
New York Highlanders managers
Boston Braves managers
Vaudeville performers
Baseball players from Atlanta
People from Jones County, Georgia
Toronto Canucks players
Birmingham Ironmakers players
Galveston Giants players
Oakland Colonels players
Toledo Black Pirates players
San Jose Dukes players
Augusta Electricians players
Kansas City Cowboys (minor league) players
Nashville Tigers players
Nashville Seraphs players
Detroit Tigers (Western League) players
Montreal Royals managers
Mercer Bears baseball coaches
Mercer Bears football coaches
Virginia Military Institute alumni
Stal